The Zhoushan Island Overhead Powerline Tie is a 220 kV three-phase AC interconnection of the power grid of Zhoushan Island with that of the Chinese mainland. This span uses two  pylons, which were the highest electricity pylons in the world, until 500kV line to Zhoushan from mainland was completed. The north tower on Damao Island was completed in 2009, and the south tower on Liangmao Island was completed in 2010. These pylons resemble those of the Messina Strait, but are steel-tube lattice structures.

Coordinates

See also 
 Lattice tower
 List of tallest freestanding structures in the world
 List of tallest freestanding steel structures

External links 
 SkyscraperPage - Damao Island Span North Tower and South Tower
 http://www.imaginechina.com/showStoryDetail.ic?id=pau301776###

Towers completed in 2009
Towers completed in 2010
Powerline river crossings
Electric power infrastructure in China